Pulling Moves is a Northern Irish television series set in Lenadoon, West Belfast.  It follows the exploits of four friends: Wardrobe (Simon Delaney), Ta (Ciarán McMenamin), Shay (Ciaran Nolan) and Darragh (Kevin Elliot). The series first aired on BBC Northern Ireland in 2003, and aired nationwide on BBC Three, running for one series of ten episodes.

Premise
Wardrobe is the leader of the group, who only loves one person, his 'wee ma' and he would do anything for her.  Ta lives with Una, the mother of his children. She is always on his case, trying to get him to leave the group, get a respectable job and make a living for her and their children, but his nature stops him from doing this.  Darragh is always trying to impress his ex-wife to allow him to keep seeing his son.  Shay is the youngest in the group, and the one who always makes the mistakes.  He is always getting into trouble and his mother always hopes that one day he will be able to get a job and be sensible like his younger sister Niamh.

Each episode follows the men trying different scams to earn money. These schemes vary from nobbling pigeon-racing to dog-breeding, and always with something funny happening to the group.  They are joined by other various characters, including "Hoker," an anti-social element who can get anything from stolen cars to lost dogs for the crowd.  Wardrobe doesn't like this guy, but Hoker is a friend of Shay's, and he's useful now and again.  Crazy Horse is the local wino, he's always drunk and sitting outside the butcher's shop, and finally, Tiny Tim, who owns a pet salon, who they help out now and again.

Episode guide

Episode 1. Clamitis. 
Aired: 
Directed by: Brian Kirk 
The guys are broke as usual and get involved in trying set up a phoney accident which would get them compensation.

Episode 2. Meat is Murder.
Aired: 
Directed by: Brian Kirk 
Ta's uncle asks the guys to dispose of a cow, but the guys spot a chance of making a few pounds selling bits of it off, not realising it's possibly infected with Mad Cow disease.

Episode 3. The Quiz.
Aired: 
Directed by: Brian Kirk 
Ta owes his ex-wife child support and she won't let him see their son until he pays up.  £1,000 prize money for a quiz at the local pub might help him out.

Episode 4. Dog-Eat-Dog.
Aired: 
Directed by: Brian Kirk 
The owner of a prize Shih-tzu hires the guys to steal another prize Shih-tzu so the two dogs can mate, but, as usual, things don't go as planned.

Episode 5. Spousal Arousal.
Aired: 
Directed by: Brian Kirk 
'Mick Bad News' thinks his wife is having an affair and hires the guys to trail her to a local hotel, where she picks up various men.  After telling him the bad news, he suggests they set up a trap for her.

Episode 6. Catch the Pigeon.
Aired: 
Directed by: Pearse Elliot 
As a favour for the wife of recently deceased Barney the Bird, the guys knock down his pigeon shed, and accidentally come across the secret formula which he fed to his pigeons to make them fly faster.  The guys then decide to sell it to the highest bidder, starting a bidding war between 'Honk Kong Paddy' and 'Petsey Pigeon'.

Episode 7. The Pirate and the Choir Boys.
Aired: 
Directed by: Pearse Elliot 
Ta gets a legit job and Shay becomes a taxi driver.  It looks like the boys are breaking up until Shay upsets Concepta McCluskey, the mother of the three biggest guys in the west.

Episode 8. Two Weddings and a Break In.
Aired: 
Directed by: Phillipa 
Wardrobe wants to buy his mum's house for her as a birthday present, but the guys are broke.  An offer from his cousin for the gang to break in and steal his wedding presents whilst he is away on honeymoon could solve Wardrobe's problem, until the local hoodlum, Hokey, gets involved.

Episode 9. The Grandfather Clock.
Aired: 
Directed by: Phillipa 
Local entrepreneur JJ Diamond enlists the help of the guys to bring a grandfather clock across the border. But dissident republicans hi-jack their van and use it for planting a bomb.

Episode 10. All Day Long.
Aired: 
Directed by: Phillipa 
Still working for JJ Diamond, the guys almost have enough money for a stag night for Ta, but when they go to do one last move for JJ, the police have arrived at his house and arrested Carol, so the guys are asked to smuggle JJ out of the country.

Cast

Simon Delaney as Wardrobe
Ciarán McMenamin as Ta
Kevin Elliott as Darragh
Ciaran Nolan as Shay
Gerard Jordan as Hoker
Kathy Kiera Clarke as Una
Lorraine Pilkington as Siobhan
Doreen Keogh as Wardbrobe's Ma
Sean McGinley as Bap the Butcher
Stephen Boyd as Aran
Dennis Greig as Crazyhorse
Tony Flynn as Dole Clerk
Paula McFetridge as Goretti
Lalor Roddy as Client Advisor 
George Shane as Policeman
Louise Ewings as Niamh
Sean McNamee as Shay's Da
Ossian McCulloch as Ciaran
Roisin Finnegan as Aoife
Bridie McMahon as Ma Maguire

References

Television shows from Northern Ireland